The William F. Kessler House is a historic house at 211 Highland Street in Newton, Massachusetts.  Built in 1913, the -story wood-frame house is a fine example of rustic Craftsman styling.  The front roof slopes down to form a porch, which is supported by brick and fieldstone piers.  The roofline is pierced by a multi-section dormer with varying window size, shapes, and roof lines.  The house was built as infill in an already-developed part of West Newton Hill by Frank Kneeland, a local builder.  William Kessler was a salesman.

The house was listed on the National Register of Historic Places in 1990.

See also
 National Register of Historic Places listings in Newton, Massachusetts

References

Houses on the National Register of Historic Places in Newton, Massachusetts
Houses completed in 1913
1913 establishments in Massachusetts